Sir Augustus Louis Carré Warren, 2nd Baronet (1754 – 30 January 1821) was an Anglo-Irish politician.

Warren was the son of Sir Robert Warren, 1st Baronet and Mary Carré. He married Mary Bernard, daughter of James Bernard and Esther Smith, in 1778. 

He was the Member of Parliament for Cork City in the Irish House of Commons between 1783 and 1790. In 1811 Warren succeeded to his father's baronetcy. He was succeeded by his eldest son, also called Augustus.

References

1754 births
1821 deaths
18th-century Anglo-Irish people
19th-century Anglo-Irish people
Baronets in the Baronetage of Ireland
Irish MPs 1783–1790
Members of the Parliament of Ireland (pre-1801) for County Cork constituencies